Naval Air Station Kingsville or NAS Kingsville (NASK)  is a United States Navy Naval Air Station located approximately 3 miles east of Kingsville, Texas in Kleberg County. NAS Kingsville is under the jurisdiction of Navy Region Southeast and is the headquarters of Training Air Wing Two. The station also operates a nearby satellite airfield, NALF Orange Grove.

Founded in 1942 as Naval Auxiliary Air Station (NAAS) Kingsville, it served nearby Naval Air Station Corpus Christi as an auxiliary field, aiding in training many of the U.S Navy's pilots for World War II. In 1968, the airfield was redesignated as Naval Air Station Kingsville, and has hosted flight training operations throughout its existence. Additionally, NAS Kingsville organizes and hosts the annual Wings Over South Texas Air Show.

Current operations

Naval Air Station Kingsville is one of the U.S. Navy’s premier locations for jet aviation training. The naval air station’s primary mission is to train Student Naval Aviators for the United States Navy and United States Marine Corps and tactical jet pilots for other select NATO and Allied countries. To accomplish its mission, NAS Kingsville is home to Training Air Wing Two and several tenant commands, military as well as civilian, with a total complement of approximately 300 officers, 200 enlisted, 350 civilian personnel, and 625 contract maintenance personnel.  The wing was the first in the Navy to operate the Boeing T-45 Goshawk aircraft, providing a single carrier-capable aircraft to replace the North American Rockwell T-2 Buckeye and the McDonnell Douglas TA-4 Skyhawk II in the Navy's strike pilot training pipeline.  Originally equipped with the T-45A model of the Goshawk, the wing began accepting new production T-45C model aircraft in 2005, which replaces the earlier T-45A aircraft's analog cockpit with a digital or "glass" cockpit similar to what students will find when they transition to operational fleet combat aircraft.  All T-45A aircraft at NAS Kingsville are slated to be retrofitted and upgraded to a T-45C configuration under the T-45 Required Avionics Modernization Program (T-45 RAMP), with a select number of RAMP modified aircraft slated for transfer to Training Air Wing SIX at NAS Pensacola, Florida in support of Student Naval Flight Officer training under the Undergraduate Military Flight Officer (UMFO) program.

NAS Kingsville is also home to one United States Army Reserve unit: Detachment 1, 370th Transportation Company (Medium Truck Palletized Load System).  Headquarters Detachment, Company F (MEDEVAC), 7th Battalion, 158th Aviation Regiment was formerly located at NASK from 2009 until the unit consolidated on Ft. Carson, CO in the summer of 2014.  There is no longer any US Army Reserve Aviation personnel or equipment at NASK.

The NAS Kingsville Operations Department operates the airfield and provides services to support operations of activity, tenant, and transiting aircraft; provides firefighting functions, both structural fire and rescue; provides air traffic control; operates the air terminal; schedules administrative and proficiency flights; repairs and maintains station ground electronics equipment; stores, maintains, and issues assigned ordnance and munitions; operates firing ranges; operates aerial targets, bombing ranges, and auxiliary landing fields.
NAS Kingsville also has both Military and Civilian security which man the entry control points and conduct vehicle inspections and patrols.

Tenant Units
Training Air Wing Two
Training Squadron 21 (VT-21) "Fighting Redhawks"
Training Squadron 22 (VT-22) "Golden Eagles"
Naval Branch Health Clinic Kingsville
Contract Employers included L-3 Vertex, Fidelity Technologies, and Rolls-Royce
CNATRA Detachment
370th Transportation Company (PLS) Detachment 1, U.S. Army Reserve

Former Tenant Units
7th Battalion, 158th Aviation Regiment, F Company (MEDEVAC)
Training Squadron Twenty Three (VT23)"Professionals"

See also 

 List of T-45 Goshawk losses
 List of United States Navy airfields

References

Naval Air Station Kingsville  (official site)

Naval Air Station Kingsville GlobalSecurity.org. Retrieved 2006-10-27
KNQI Kingsville Naval Air Station AirNav.com Retrieved 2006-10-27

External links

Kingsville, Naval Air Station
Kingsville, Texas
Buildings and structures in Kleberg County, Texas
Military facilities in Texas
Military installations in Texas
Military installations established in 1942
1942 establishments in Texas